Alabama Crimson Tide football under Nick Saban covers the history of the Alabama Crimson Tide football program since Nick Saban was hired as head coach in 2007. Alabama plays as part of the National Collegiate Athletic Association (NCAA) Football Bowl Subdivision (FBS) and is a member of the West Division of the Southeastern Conference (SEC). The Tide plays its home games at Bryant–Denny Stadium in Tuscaloosa, Alabama. Their overall official record under Saban is 189-27 (194–27 on the field), 22 bowl game appearances with 16 victories, nine SEC West titles, eight SEC championships, and six national championships. Since 2008, Saban's teams have spent part or all of each season ranked No. 1 in national polls.

On January 3, 2007, Nick Saban officially accepted the head coaching position with the Crimson Tide. In 2008, Saban led them to their first undefeated regular season since 92-93, but they lost the SEC Championship Game and the Sugar Bowl. In 2009, Saban led Alabama to a perfect 14–0 and its first BCS National Championship, as well as its first overall national championship since 1992. After a relatively disappointing 10–3 2010 season, Saban led the Tide to back-to-back BCS National Championships in the 2011 and 2012 seasons. The 2013 team won its first eleven games but failed to capture a third consecutive national championship, losing the last two. Saban's 2014 team won the SEC West and SEC championships, then lost to Ohio State in the inaugural College Football Playoff's semi-final round at the Sugar Bowl, finishing 12-2. Saban won his fourth national championship at Alabama in 2015 and his fifth at the new Mercedes-Benz Stadium in 2017. In  2018, the team experienced many highs and lows, losing the National Championship Game to No.2 Clemson. Saban won his sixth national championship at Alabama and seventh of his career in 2020 by defeating Ohio State 52-24. The win gave Saban the most national titles of all time, breaking Paul Bear Bryant's previous record of six, at the same school.

Before Saban, Alabama had no Heisman Trophy winners, and many players whose competed at Alabama during Saban's tenure have also been recognized for their on-field accomplishments. Mark Ingram II (2009), Derrick Henry (2015), DeVonta Smith (2020) and Bryce Young (2021) are Alabama's four Heisman Trophy winners, with Young taking 83% of voters. 71 players have been recognized as First Team All-Americans, 45 by consensus or unanimously. Additionally, 113 former Crimson Tide players have been drafted into the National Football League, 41 as first-round selections, under Coach Saban. The University of Alabama Crimson Tide football, under AD Greg Byrne, extended HC Nick Saban's contract until the 2028 season.

Overview

Hiring
After four seasons as head coach in which he compiled an overall record of 26–23 on November 26, 2006, Mike Shula was fired as head coach of the Crimson Tide. At the time of his firing, athletic director Mal Moore promoted defensive coordinator Joe Kines into the role of interim head coach for the Independence Bowl and that the search for a permanent replacement would begin immediately. At that time several current coaches were rumored to be in consideration for the position at Alabama, with Steve Spurrier of South Carolina and Saban of the Miami Dolphins thought to be the preferred candidates. On November 27, Saban publicly stated he had not been contacted by Alabama and that he had no interest in leaving the Dolphins to become the head coach of the Crimson Tide.

In early December, Moore made a preliminary offer to Saban's agent Jimmy Sexton to coach at Alabama for $5 million per season for seven years with a $7 million signing bonus. At that time Saban also stated he had not personally interviewed at Alabama and told his players that he was not leaving. After West Virginia head coach Rich Rodriguez turned down an offer to coach the Crimson Tide, speculation again focused on Saban. As the rumors persisted that he was prepared to take the Alabama job, on December 21 Saban stated "I guess I have to say it, I'm not going to be the Alabama coach" in an effort to stop the Alabama rumors. After the Dolphins season ended, it was speculated again that Alabama was to offer their head coaching position to Saban. On January 3, 2007, Saban officially resigned from the Dolphins and became the head coach of the Crimson Tide. At that time he signed an eight-year contract worth a guaranteed $32 million to coach Alabama.

First season

After his hiring, Saban worked to hire his first staff and complete his first recruiting class with the Crimson Tide. His staff did not include any of Shula's former staff, and Kevin Steele was hired as defensive coordinator and Major Applewhite as offensive coordinator. On February 7, he landed his first recruiting class that was highly ranked by the major recruiting services in spite of having just over a month to complete it. Anticipation for his first season continued to build through his first spring practices, and reached its peak when an overflow crowd of 92,138 attended the A-Day spring game on April 21.

In Saban's debut as head coach, the Crimson Tide defeated Western Carolina for his first win at Alabama. They followed that victory with his first road win at Vanderbilt and his first win over a ranked opponent against No. 16 Arkansas for a 3–0 record to open the season. They entered the polls at the No. 16 position, but then lost in overtime at home against Georgia and in the River City Showdown at Jacksonville Municipal Stadium to Florida State. Alabama rebounded with three consecutive wins over Houston on homecoming, at Ole Miss and at home over Tennessee.

Prior to their game against the Vols, Antoine Caldwell, Marlon Davis, Glen Coffee, Marquis Johnson and Chris Rogers were suspended as a result of violating NCAA rules. The violation was a result of a failure in the distribution system of textbooks that was deemed to be an improper benefits as defined by the NCAA. After the NCAA reviewed the case, in June 2009 they determined all players who received the improper benefits to be retroactively ineligible. As part of their penalty, the NCAA forced Alabama to vacate football victories that dated back to the 2005 season through the first five games of the 2007 season.

After their victory over Tennessee, the Crimson Tide lost their four remaining regular season games. Against his former team LSU, the Crimson Tide lost to the eventual national champions in what was dubbed "the Saban Bowl". They followed that with a loss at Mississippi State and against Louisiana–Monroe in one of the bigger upsets of the 2007 season. After their sixth consecutive loss to Auburn in the Iron Bowl, Alabama closed the season with a victory over Colorado in the Independence Bowl and finished the season with a winning record at 7-6 in Saban's first season.

2008 season

Looking to improve on their 7–6 record from the previous season, Alabama signed the top recruiting class as determined by a wide variety of selectors. The class featured many players who were later drafted into the NFL and formed the foundation for their championship run from 2009 through 2012. Players from the class included future first round draft picks Marcell Dareus, Julio Jones, Mark Barron, Dont'a Hightower, and Mark Ingram II. The Crimson Tide then completed spring practice with another large A-Day crowd before the season started later in the fall.

The Crimson Tide opened the season ranked No. 24, and they defeated No. 9 Clemson in the inaugural Chick-fil-A College Kickoff to open the season. They followed the victory with home wins over Tulane and Western Kentucky and won on the road over Arkansas before a much-hyped game at Georgia. Ranked No. 8 and playing against the No. 3 Bulldogs in what was deemed a "blackout" game by Georgia head coach Mark Richt, the Crimson Tide took a 31–0 halftime lead en route to a 41–30 upset victory. After their win, the Crimson Tide moved into the No. 2 ranking and then defeated Kentucky, Ole Miss, Tennessee and Arkansas State on homecoming to extend their record to 9–0.

After No. 1 Texas lost to Texas Tech, the Crimson Tide achieved their first regular season No. 1 ranking in the AP Poll since the 1980 season and their first ever No. 1 Bowl Championship Series (BCS) ranking prior to their game at LSU. In what was Saban's first game at Tiger Stadium since he resigned as LSU's coach after their 2004 season, the Crimson Tide defeated the Tigers 27–21 in overtime. The victory over LSU also allowed the Crimson Tide to clinch the SEC West Division championship, and earned a spot in the SEC Championship Game. Alabama then closed with wins over Mississippi State and Auburn, that ended their six-game losing streak in the Iron Bowl, and finished the regular season undefeated 12–0. Although favored, a two touchdown rally led by Florida's Tim Tebow in the fourth quarter resulted in the Crimson Tide failing to capture the SEC championship and instead of playing for a national championship, they accepted an invitation to play in the Sugar Bowl. Against an undefeated Utah team, Alabama was upset 31–17 and finished the season with an overall record of 12–2.

First national championship

Although they reached their first BCS game since the 1999 season, Alabama looked improve for the 2009 season after they closed 2008 on a two-game losing streak after a 12–0 start to the year. Again, the Crimson Tide secured one of the top ranked recruiting classes for the third consecutive season in February 2009. Just as in the previous year, the 2009 class included many players who played significant roles in their championship run. These players included first round NFL draft picks James Carpenter, Dre Kirkpatrick, Trent Richardson, D. J. Fluker, and Chance Warmack in addition to Eddie Lacy and A. J. McCarron. In the annual A-Day game, the Crimson team defeated the White team by a score of 14–7 before 84,050 fans at Bryant–Denny Stadium.

For the second year in a row, Alabama opened the season at Atlanta in the Chick-fil-A Kickoff Game. Against Virginia Tech, the Crimson Tide trailed at halftime, but an 18-point rally in the fourth quarter gave Alabama the 34–24 win. After consecutive wins over non-conference Florida International and North Texas, the Crimson Tide defeated Arkansas 35–7 to open conference play at Bryant–Denny Stadium. Alabama next went on a two-game road trip, defeated both Kentucky and Ole Miss and extended their record to 6–0.

The Crimson Tide then returned home where they played South Carolina on homecoming. Against the Gamecocks, Mark Ingram II had a career-high with 246 rushing yards and entered the Heisman Trophy conversation as he led Alabama to a 20–6 victory. In their next game, a pair of Terrence Cody blocked field goals, one of which came as time expired, preserved a 12–10 win over rival Tennessee. With a berth in the SEC Championship Game on the line, the Crimson Tide clinched the West division championship with a 24–15 victory LSU in their next game. Alabama then closed the season with wins over Mississippi State, Chattanooga and Auburn and completed their second consecutive, undefeated regular season.

In the SEC Championship Game, Alabama faced East division champion Florida for the second season in a row in a No. 1 versus No. 2 matchup. With both the conference championship and a berth in the 2010 BCS National Championship Game on the line, the Crimson Tide defeated the Gators 32–13 and won the SEC for the first time since 1999. At the conclusion of the regular season, Mark Ingram II won the first Heisman Trophy in Alabama history with the closest margin of victory in the history of the award over Toby Gerhart. The Crimson Tide then closed the season with a 37–21 victory over Texas to finish a perfect 14-0 and recorded their first national championship since the 1992 season and their 13th overall in the history of the program.

2010 season

As the defending national champions, Alabama entered the 2010 season as the favorite to repeat and win their second national championship in as many years. After again signing a highly rated recruiting class, the Crimson Tide opened the season in the No. 1 position in the polls. Alabama then won their first five games over San Jose State, Penn State, Duke, Arkansas, and Florida and retained their unanimous No. 1 ranking. However, in their sixth game, the Crimson Tide lost their first regular season game since the 2007 season when they were upset at South Carolina 35–21.

They rebounded the next week with a 23–10 win over Ole Miss on homecoming and at Tennessee by a margin of 41–10 before their top ten matchup at LSU. Against the Tigers, a late Stevan Ridley touchdown run set up by a 23-yard DeAngelo Peterson run on a fourth-down play gave LSU the upset victory and effectively ended the opportunity for an Alabama repeat of the national championship. The Crimson Tide then defeated Mississippi State and Georgia State prior to their season finale against Auburn. With the No. 2 Tigers still in the national championship picture, Auburn overcame a 24–0 deficit and won 28–27 in what was the largest comeback in Iron Bowl history. Alabama then closed the season with a 49–7 victory over Michigan State, Saban's former two-time employer, in the Capital One Bowl and finished with an overall record of 10–3.

Second national championship

After a disappointing 2010 season in which they opened the year as a national title favorite and ended with three losses, the Crimson Tide looked to regain their championship form for the 2011 campaign. After again signing one of the top recruiting classes in the country, and going through spring practice, tragedy struck Tuscaloosa on April 27, 2011, when an EF4 rated tornado devastated the city. The tornado resulted in the deaths of 43 people in the city, including the girlfriend of Crimson Tide long snapper Carson Tinker, and the team later would dedicate their season to both the victims and survivors of the storm.

The Crimson Tide opened the season with a 48–7 victory over Saban's alma mater, Kent State and then traveled to Beaver Stadium and defeated Penn State 27–11 in what would be Joe Paterno's final meeting vs. the Crimson Tide (he was fired November 9, 2011 in the wake of the Jerry Sandusky child sex abuse scandal, then died January 22, 2012). After a 41–0 shutout over North Texas, Alabama opened conference play with a 38–14 victory over Arkansas. After they defeated Florida 38–10 at Gainesville, the Crimson Tide shutout Vanderbilt 34–0, and defeated both Ole Miss and Tennessee to set up a "Game of the Century" against LSU.

Against the Tigers, neither team scored a touchdown and LSU won by a final score of 9–6 in overtime. With the loss, Alabama dropped into the No. 3 BCS position prior to their game against Mississippi State. However, they regained the No. 2 ranking in all the polls after Oklahoma State was upset by Iowa State, and they defeated the Bulldogs at Starkville. Alabama then closed the regular season with wins over both Georgia Southern and Auburn and finished in second place in the West division behind LSU.

After the Tigers won the SEC Championship Game, a rematch against the Crimson Tide became the likely pairing for the 2012 BCS National Championship Game. Alabama qualified for the BCS National Championship Game after they received a final BCS score of .942, just slightly ahead of Oklahoma State's BCS score of .933. In their rematch against LSU at the Mercedes-Benz Superdome in New Orleans, the Crimson Tide shutout the SEC champion Tigers 21–0 and captured Alabama's second BCS championship and 14th overall national championship.

Third national championship

After they captured their second national championship in three years, Alabama again signed one of the nation's top recruiting classes in February 2012. After they completed spring practice in April, the Crimson Tide entered the season with a No. 2 ranking and as a favorite to repeat as national champions. Alabama opened the season with a 41–14 victory over Michigan in the Cowboys Classic. After their win over the Wolverines, the Crimson Tide moved into the No. 1 ranking prior to their game against Western Kentucky that they won 35–0 in their home opener. The next week, Alabama posted their second consecutive shutout with their 52–0 win at Arkansas to open conference play. The Crimson Tide then returned to Tuscaloosa and defeated Florida Atlantic and Ole Miss prior to their first win over Missouri as conference foes at Faurot Field.

Next Alabama defeated rival Tennessee 44–13 at Neyland Stadium and followed that with a 38–7 win over then undefeated and No. 13 ranked Mississippi State. The Crimson Tide then defeated LSU at Tiger Stadium 21–17 when A. J. McCarron threw a screen pass to T. J. Yeldon that he took 28 yards for the game-winning touchdown within the final minute of play. However, the next week, Alabama suffered their only loss of the season when Texas A&M upset the Tide 29–24 in Tuscaloosa.

After their loss to the Aggies, Alabama dropped into the No. 4 ranking for their 49–0 win over Western Carolina. In the evening after their win over the Catamounts, Alabama moved back into the No. 2 position as a result of upset losses for both Kansas State and Oregon. Alabama then closed the regular season with a 49–0 win over Auburn and captured the SEC West division title to play Georgia in the SEC Championship Game. In the championship game, Alabama escaped with a 32–28 win after the Bulldogs were stopped inside the Crimson Tide's five-yard line as time expired and captured the SEC Championship and a berth in the BCS National Championship Game against Notre Dame. In the BCS Championship Game, the Tide defeated the Irish 42–14 and captured their third national championship in four years and the schools 15th overall football championship.

2013 season

As the two-time defending national champions, Alabama entered the 2013 season as the favorite to repeat and win their third consecutive national championship and their fourth in five years. After again signing a highly rated recruiting class, the Crimson Tide opened the season in the No. 1 position in the polls. Alabama then won their first eleven games and retained their unanimous No. 1 ranking throughout. The Crimson Tide opened the season with a victory over Virginia Tech in the Chick-fil-A Kickoff Game at Atlanta. After their first bye week Alabama traveled to Kyle Field where they defeated Texas A&M in a 49–42 shootout that saw the Aggies have the best offensive day against a Crimson Tide defense in the history of the program.

The defense responded after the A&M game and did not allow a touchdown over the next 14-quarters in victories over Colorado State, Ole Miss, Georgia State and Kentucky. After the touchdown-free streak ended, started a three-game homestand that saw Alabama shutout Arkansas and defeat both Tennessee and LSU in back-to-back rivalry games. They next defeated Mississippi State and Chattanooga that set up a top five matchup against Auburn.

In the Iron Bowl, Alabama kicker Adam Griffith attempted and missed a 57-yard field goal attempt as time expired in regulation. In what was since dubbed "The Kick Six", Chris Davis returned the missed field goal 109 yards (officially, 100 yards; unlike the NFL, the NCAA only counts return yardage from goal line to goal line) for the game-winning score with no time left on the clock to clinch a 34–28 Auburn victory. As the loss also cost the Crimson Tide an opportunity to play for both the SEC and national championships, they were selected to play in the 2014 Sugar Bowl. In the game, Alabama was defeated by Oklahoma 45–31 and closed the season with an overall record of 11–2.

2014 season

Alabama entered the 2014 season ranked #3 in the polls.  The Crimson Tide rolled off four straight victories before losing to Ole Miss 17-23.  Their loss to Ole Miss dropped them down to #7 in the rankings.  However, Alabama rebounded by winning eight straight games, including victories against #14 LSU, #1 Mississippi State, and #15 Auburn in the Iron Bowl.  They then defeated #14 Missouri in the SEC Championship 42–13 and earned a spot in the inaugural College Football Playoff, where they lost to the eventual national champion Ohio State 35-42.

Fourth national championship

Alabama started the 2015 season with a win against 20th ranked Wisconsin. Alabama would start 2-0 but would lose their next game against Ole Miss 43-37. Following the loss the Crimson Tide would go in to win the next twelve games including the 2015 Cotton Bowl Playoff Semifinal 38-0 over Michigan State and winning the 2016 College Football Playoff National Championship over undefeated Clemson 45-40 to claim Alabama's 16th National Championship and Saban's fourth national championship at the Capstone.

2016 season

Alabama entered the 2016 season ranked #1 in the polls. The reigning national champions began 2016 with a resounding 52-6 win over #9 USC in Arlington, Texas, led by true freshman quarterback, Jalen Hurts. In what was the first meeting between the Tide and the Trojans since 1985, Blake Barnett started the game, but was soon replaced by Hurts, who would then go on to be the starting QB for the season. Hurts was the first true freshman QB to start for the Crimson Tide since 1984. For the first time since 2009, Alabama would go undefeated all the way through the SEC Championship Game. Alabama crushed Florida 54–16 to win their third consecutive SEC Title. This made the Tide the first three-peat SEC Champion since the Florida Gators won four in a row from 1993–1996. It also marked the first three peat for Alabama since the late 1970s when Alabama won SEC Championships from 1977–1979. The Tide would once again go on to the Playoffs where they would defeat the Washington Huskies 24-7 in the Peach Bowl to advance to their second consecutive College Football Playoff National Championship Game in Tampa, Florida. In the first-ever national title game rematch, Alabama would fall to Clemson, 35-31. In the closing seconds of the game, Clemson QB Deshaun Watson found Hunter Renfrow for a two-yard touchdown pass to give Clemson the win and their first national championship since 1981. The loss ended Alabama's 26 game winning streak, the second-longest in program history. It marked the first time Nick Saban had ever lost in a national championship game.

Fifth national championship

Alabama entered the 2017 season ranked No. 1 in the polls once again. The season began with the Tide defeating No. 3 Florida State 24–7 in the Chick Fila Kick off Game at Mercedes-Benz Stadium in Atlanta. Alabama would then go on to win their next ten games, heading into the Iron Bowl undefeated and still ranked number 1. However, the regular season was not without its issues. The Tide lost several key defensive players to injury throughout the season. There were some impressive blow outs, but also some very close games against Texas A&M, LSU, and Mississippi State. With the SEC West on the line, the Tide would fall to Auburn, 26–14 in a game that saw the worst performance by an Alabama team since the Mike Shula era. However, the season was not over for the Tide by a long shot. Auburn would go on to the SEC Championship Game, where they would face Georgia in a rematch from earlier in the season. The Bulldogs would prevail the second time around, crushing the Tigers 28–7 and leading to discussion of whether a similar situation to 2011 would take place. When the rankings were released, the playoff selection committee tapped both Alabama and Georgia for the playoffs. Alabama was selected to face Clemson in the Sugar Bowl Playoff Semifinal. In a rematch of the previous season's College Football Playoff National Championship Game, the Tide would prevail, blowing out Clemson 24–6. Georgia's 54–48 overtime win over Oklahoma in the Rose Bowl Playoff semifinal set up an all-SEC National Championship Game where the Tide would win its 17th national championship by defeating Georgia 26–23 in overtime. With Alabama trailing 13–0 at halftime, a change was made at quarterback with freshman Tua Tagovailoa replacing a struggling Jalen Hurts. Tagovailoa went 14 of 24 passing for 166 yards and three touchdowns, including the game-winning touchdown pass to freshman wide receiver, DeVonta Smith in overtime. The 2017 national title was the sixth for head coach Nick Saban, and his fifth at the Capstone. This accomplishment tied coach Saban with iconic Alabama head coach, Paul W. Bryant, who also won six national titles in his storied career.

2018 season

Alabama entered the 2018 season as the reigning national champions and ranked No. 1 in the nation once again. Alabama opened the season with a dominating win over Louisville, 51–14 in the Camping World Kickoff in Orlando, Florida. Tua Tagovailoa had won the starting QB job in the off season over two-year starter, Jalen Hurts. Tagovailoa turned in several stellar performances as Alabama rolled to their 2nd undefeated regular season in three years. Alabama would score 50-plus points in eight of their games. Alabama also set three records during the season. They became the first ever SEC team to score 50-plus points in three consecutive games. Also, when Alabama shut out LSU 29–0 and Mississippi State 24–0, it marked the first time in history that an SEC team had shut out two consecutive conference opponents. As well, Alabama become the first team since Yale in 1888 to outscore each of their first twelve opponents by 20 or more points. Alabama avenged their only loss of the 2017 season with a decisive 31 point win over arch rival Auburn, 52–21 in Tuscaloosa. Tagovailoa completed 25 of 32 passes and threw for 324 yards and five touchdowns in the Tide's Iron Bowl win. He also had a TD himself, running one in early in the game, bringing the total to 6, an Iron Bowl record. The following week, Alabama would meet Georgia in the 2018 SEC Championship Game, a rematch of the 2017 CFP National Championship Game. In a mirror image of the previous season's National Championship Game, Alabama's backup QB (this time Jalen Hurts) came in and engineered a dramatic comeback. Tagovailoa had been injured in the fourth quarter, and it was Hurts who led Alabama to a 35–28 victory. This was the school's 27th SEC Championship and it sent Alabama to the playoffs once again where they would defeat the Oklahoma Sooners in the Orange Bowl Playoff Semifinal, 45–34. The Cotton Bowl was the site of the other Playoff Semifinal, where Clemson would defeat Notre Dame 30–3 to set up a fourth consecutive Alabama-Clemson meeting in the postseason. This time, Clemson would win handily, routing Alabama 44–16 in the CFP National Championship Game in Santa Clara, California. It was the worst loss of the Saban era and the worst loss for the program since 2003, when LSU defeated Alabama 27–3.

2019 season

Alabama entered the 2019 season as the reigning SEC Champions and ranked number 2 in the nation behind reigning national champion Clemson. Alabama opened the season with a blowout win over Duke, 42-3 in the 2019 Chick Fila Kickoff Game in Atlanta. The season saw its share of misfortune. While Alabama was undefeated going into their game vs LSU in November, the season ending injuries had piled up, mainly on an already young and inexperienced defense. It turned out to be the worst defense in Nick Saban's career. QB Tua Tagovailoa suffered a high ankle sprain against Tennessee that required surgery and put him out of action for weeks. Backup QB Mac Jones took over and Alabama won the game 35-13, but the game was closer than the final score indicated. Jones would play the entire game the following week vs. Arkansas as Bama rolled to a 48-7 win. Tagovailoa returned for the game against LSU which saw the Tigers prevail over Bama 46-41. It was LSU's first win over Alabama since the 2011 regular season meeting between the teams. Although Alabama battled back in the game, they never had the lead. They trailed by 3 touchdowns at halftime. It was also their first home loss since 2015. The following week saw even more misfortune. Tua Tagovailoa, still recovering from the injury in the Tennessee game, suffered a dislocated hip against Mississippi State, but unlike before, he would not play again. This thrust Mac Jones into the starting role for the remainder of the season. Jones turned in a great performance the following week, albeit in a 66-3 win over FCS team, Western Carolina. Jones then had the task of playing in his first ever SEC road game against Auburn at Jordan Hare Stadium, a place where Alabama had not fared well in recent years. While Jones had a great game, Auburn would prevail 48-45. Despite going up against the number one defense in the nation, the Alabama backup QB went 26 of 39 and passed for 335 yards. Wide receiver Jaylen Waddle had 230 yards and 4 touchdowns, including a 98-yard kickoff return for a score. Alabama's inability to stop Auburn on offense and Jones' two interceptions returned for touchdowns proved impossible to overcome. Alabama would finish the 2019 regular season with a 10-2 record. It would mark the first time since 2010 that the Tide would lose two regular season games and it would be the first time in the playoff era that they would not make the semifinals. Bama closed out 2019 with a 35-16 win over Michigan in the Citrus Bowl, finishing the season with an 11-2 record. This game marked the end of the 2010s decade for Alabama football. For the first time in program history, Alabama went the entirety of a decade with double digit wins in every year.

Sixth national championship

In a season that was under constant threat of cancellation due to the Covid-19 pandemic, Alabama began the year ranked number 2 in the nation. Like all other teams in the nation, Alabama's schedule had been drastically altered so as to play a revised season due to the pandemic. Gone off the schedule were USC, Georgia State, Kent State, and UT-Martin. All teams played within their own conferences until the postseason. Alabama opened the season on the last weekend of September by defeating Missouri 38-19 in Columbia. Next came a 52-24 win over Texas A&M in the home opener. It would be the Aggies only loss of the 2020 season. The season would see its share of disruptions due to Covid-19. Nick Saban tested positive before the game against Georgia on October 17. However, it was later deemed a false positive and he was able to coach the game, which saw Alabama defeat Georgia by a final score of 41-24. The following week, wide receiver Jaylen Waddle suffered an injury on the opening kickoff against Tennessee in Knoxville. It was to keep him out for the remainder of the season, although he did have successful surgery and did return in a limited role in the CFP national championship game against Ohio State. The game against LSU had to be postponed until December due to Covid-19 and thus the Tide had a long layoff during the regular season, going three weeks without playing. Alabama returned to action by defeating Kentucky 63-3 and avenging the previous season's Iron Bowl loss by crushing Auburn 42-13 in Tuscaloosa. Coach Saban was unable to be at the game due to having tested positive for Covid-19 just a few days earlier. Unlike before, this was not a false positive. Offensive coordinator Steve Sarkisian was acting head coach in the win against their cross state rivals. The Tide would then avenge the 2019 loss to LSU by blowing them out 55-17 in Baton Rouge. It was the most points Alabama had ever scored against LSU and it was the second worse home loss for LSU in their history. The regular season concluded with a 52-3 win against Arkansas in Fayetteville in another game that had been rescheduled. Alabama became the first team ever to win 10 SEC games in a single season. Next came the 2020 SEC Championship Game which saw the Tide win the 2020 SEC Title by defeating the Florida Gators in a high scoring affair, 52-46. Alabama would next meet Notre Dame in the Rose Bowl Playoff Semifinal defeating the Fighting Irish 31-14. The Ohio State Buckeyes defeated the heavily favored Clemson Tigers, 49-28 in the Sugar Bowl Playoff Semifinal to set up an Alabama- Ohio State CFP National Championship Game in Miami. On January 5, 2021, wide receiver Devonta Smith would win the Heisman Trophy, becoming the third winner of the award in school history. In what was the first meeting between the Tide and the Buckeyes since 2014, the inaugural year of the playoffs, the Tide rolled to a 52-24 win over the Buckeyes. The win gave the Tide its sixth national title under head coach Nick Saban and its 18th overall. It was an unprecedented seventh national title for coach Saban, giving him the most all time of any head coach, breaking the legendary Paul Bear Bryant's previous record of six.

2021 Season

Alabama began 2021 as the reigning national champions and once again, ranked number one in the nation. Bryce Young won the starting QB role in the offseason, and in the season opener, Alabama routed Miami, 44-13 in the 2021 Chick Fila Kickoff Game in Atlanta. The third game of the season saw the Tide struggle in a 31-29 win against Florida in Gainesville, after getting out to huge lead early on. Alabama's issues caught up with them in October as the Tide fell to Texas A&M, 41-38, in College Station. This was the first win for the Aggies over the Tide since 2012. The remainder of the season was a rollercoaster. While Alabama would roll through the remainder of the regular season without a loss, the season was not without its woes. Shockingly close games against LSU and Auburn saw the Tide escape with narrow wins. In the first ever Iron Bowl to go to overtime, Alabama managed to escape against Auburn 24-22 in 4 overtimes at Jordan Hare Stadium. Bryce Young hit wide receiver John Metchie for the game winning two point play in the 4th overtime to lift the Tide to a win. However, the following week, Alabama would route Georgia in the SEC Championship Game by the same score as the previous season, 41-24. It was the Tide's second consecutive SEC Championship and the win sent Alabama to the playoffs once again where they would defeat Cincinnati 27-6 in the Cotton Bowl Semifinal. Georgia would defeat Michigan in the Orange Bowl Semifinal, setting up an Alabama-Georgia rematch in the CFP National Championship Game. Georgia would defeat Alabama the second time around, 33-18, giving the Bulldogs their first national championship since 1980. It marked Georgia's first win against the Tide since 2007 and it was Alabama's first loss to an SEC East team since 2010. Alabama finished 2021 with a record of 13-2. Also in 2021, Bryce Young won the Heisman Trophy, becoming Alabama's the second consecutive winner of the award, the fourth overall, and the first quarterback in Alabama history to win it.

2022 Season

Alabama began 2022 ranked number one in the nation. The season began with a 55-0 win over Utah State. It was Bama's first shutout win in a season opener since 1988 when the Tide defeated Temple 37-0. The following week was a road game against Texas in Austin. In what was the Tide and the Longhorns' first meeting since the BCS National Championship Game played after the 2009 season as well as Bama's first trip to Austin, TX in 100 years, Bama squeaked by with a 20-19 win. The Tide would go on to win convincingly in games against UL-Monroe, Vanderbilt, and Arkansas. QB Bryce Young was seriously injured against Arkansas, and thus could not play in the following game against Texas A&M. Backup QB Jalen Milroe got the start. The Tide barely escaped with a 24-20 win against the Aggies in Tuscaloosa, narrowly avoiding a second consecutive shocking upset loss to them. The next week was the annual Third Saturday in October vs Tennessee. After falling behind early, Bama came back and took the lead, only to watch Tennessee come back late and tie the game. Bama had one final chance to get the win, but Will Reichard missed what would have been the game winning field goal. This enabled Tennessee time to put together one final drive to get into Tennessee place kicker Chase McGrath's range. McGrath hit a 40 yard field goal as time expired, giving Tennessee a 52-49 win over Alabama, the Vols' first since 2006 over the Tide, thus ending a 15 year Alabama win streak. The Tide would suffer it's only other loss of the 2022 season in overtime, 32-31 against LSU in Baton Rouge. It was Alabama's first loss in Tiger Stadium since 2010. This solidified the SEC West title for LSU, and effectively knocked Bama out of the playoffs. After lackluster performances against Ole Miss and Austin Peay, the Tide would defeat their cross state rival, Auburn by a final of 49-27 in Tuscaloosa. The Tigers were being led by interim head coach, Carnell "Cadillac" Williams after the midseason dismissal of previous head coach Bryan Harsin. Bama was selected to go to the Sugar Bowl where they would meet Kansas State for the first time ever. The Tide concluded the 2022 season with a 45-20 win against the Wildcats. Alabama would finish 2022 11-2, having missed the playoffs for just the second time since the playoff format began.

Rivalries

Auburn  

The main rivalry of the Crimson Tide is against its in-state rival, Auburn University Tigers; considered one of the top sporting rivalries in the US. The Alabama-Auburn annual game has come to be known as the Iron Bowl. The outcome of the game generally determines "bragging rights" in the state of Alabama until the following contest. The game may also have implications as to which team will represent the SEC Western Division in the SEC Championship Game.

On February 22, 1893, at Lakeview Park in Birmingham, Auburn was victorious in the first ever Iron Bowl, 32–22. The series was suspended after the 1907 contest, due to violence and financial complications. In 1944, Auburn suggested to reopen the series, though the board of trustees at Alabama rejected. The series was resumed in 1948, with Alabama crushing the Tigers 55–0, which is still the largest margin of victory in the series. In the following contest, Auburn shocked Alabama with a 14–13 victory, which is credited with helping revive the series.

For many years, the contest was held at Legion Field in Birmingham, before the teams began alternating between Bryant-Denny Stadium, in Tuscaloosa, and Jordan–Hare Stadium, in Auburn. Alabama won the most recent meeting 49-27 in Tuscaloosa, and leads the series at 49–37–1.

Tennessee

Despite the heated in-state rivalry with Auburn, Bear Bryant was more adamant about defeating his rivals to the north, the Tennessee Volunteers. The series is named the Third Saturday in October, the traditional calendar date on which the game was played. Despite the name, the game has been played on the third Saturday only five times between 1995 and 2007. The first game between the two sides was played in 1901 in Birmingham, ending in a 6–6 tie. From 1902 to 1913, Alabama dominated the series, losing only once, and never allowing a touchdown by the Volunteers. Beginning in 1928, the rivalry was first played on its traditional date and began to be a challenge for the Crimson Tide as Robert Neyland began challenging Alabama for their perennial spot on top of the conference standings. In the 1950s, Jim Goostree, the head trainer for Alabama, began another tradition as he began handing out cigars following a victory over the Volunteers.

Between 1971 and 1981, Alabama held an 11-game winning streak over the Volunteers and, between 1986 and 1994, a nine-game unbeaten streak. However, following Alabama's streak, Tennessee responded with a seven-game winning streak from 1995 to 2001. Alabama holds the longest winning streak at 15 from 2007 to 2021. Tennessee won the most recent meeting 52–49 in Knoxville, while Alabama leads the series 58–38–8.

LSU

A rivalry within the SEC Western Division occurs yearly between Alabama and the LSU Tigers. Starting in 1895, the Tigers were victorious 12–6 in the first meeting. The teams did not regularly meet until the mid-1960s during Alabama's dominance of the SEC. Between 1971 and 1981, the Crimson Tide won 11 consecutive times. In the 1969 game, LSU defeated Alabama 20–15 in Baton Rouge. Alabama did not lose again in Baton Rouge until 2000.

In 2007, the meeting was more heated following Alabama's hiring of head coach Nick Saban, who previously coached at LSU. With the hiring, many media outlets dubbed the 2007 meeting as the "Saban Bowl". The Crimson Tide lost the first "Saban Bowl" in 2007, won the 2008 and 2009 meetings only to lose in Baton Rouge in 2010.

In 2011, the teams played as the consensus No.1 and No.2 ranked teams in the polls with LSU winning 9–6 in overtime. They played each other again for the BCS National Championship with Alabama winning 21–0 to secure its 14th National Championship. LSU won the most recent meeting 32-31 in OT in Baton Rouge, while Alabama leads the series 55–27-5.

Mississippi State

Alabama's most-played rival is Mississippi State. The rivalry has been called the "Battle for Highway 82", with the schools being only 90 miles apart. Many cite the 2014 meeting as the biggest game in the series where Alabama faced a #1 ranked, 10–0 Mississippi State team with Dak Prescott as its quarterback. Alabama won 25–20, which helped catapult them into the first College Football Playoff. Alabama won the most recent meeting 30–6 in Tuscaloosa and leads the series 85–18–3.

Clemson

The series dates back to 1900 but the rivalry has intensified in recent years, with the last four meetings having national championship implications. Alabama leads the series 14–5.

Florida

Alabama has a rivalry with the Florida Gators, which was largely developed with the start of the SEC Championship Game. Alabama and Florida have met in 10 SEC Title Games (Alabama leads 6–4 in Title games), including the first 3 from 1992 to 1994.  Alabama won the most recent meeting 31–29 in Gainesville, and leads the entire series 28–14 on the field (27–14 with the Alabama 2005 win vacated).

Georgia

Alabama has a rivalry with the Georgia Bulldogs. Alabama has 42 wins in the series while the Bulldogs have 26 wins. Georgia  won the most recent meeting 33–18 in the 2022 College Football Playoff National Championship while Alabama leads the series 42–26–4.

Former rivalries
The Georgia Tech Yellow Jackets were at one time considered Alabama's arch rival. During the suspension of the Iron Bowl between 1907 and 1948, Georgia Tech (then a member of the SEC) emerged as the most intense game on Alabama's schedule. The teams played many significant games, especially in the late 1950s and early 1960s. A heated feud developed between Bear Bryant and Georgia Tech head coach Bobby Dodd following a controversial hit in the 1961 game, a 10–0 Alabama victory. Dodd cited this feud as the primary impetus for Georgia Tech leaving the SEC three years later. The two teams have met 52 times, making Georgia Tech Alabama's most played among current non-conference opponents. Alabama leads the series 28–21–3; Georgia Tech won the last meeting in 1984. Alabama's fight song, "Yea Alabama", mentions Georgia Tech with the line "Send the Yellow Jackets to a watery grave."

There have been many historic games between Alabama and Penn State. The two teams met five times during the tenure of Bear Bryant, including in the 1979 Sugar Bowl, which determined the national championship for the 1978 season. The games usually have national implicationsseven of the 15 meetings between the two schools have featured both teams ranked in the top tenand eight of the meetings have been decided by a touchdown or less. The most recent game was in 2011, with Alabama winning 27–11. It was the final loss for long-time Penn State head coach Joe Paterno. Alabama leads the series 10–5.

Head coaching record

First-team All-Americans

Reference:

NFL draftees

Reference:

All-time assistant coaches

Reference:

Bryant–Denny Stadium

During Saban's tenure as head coach of the Crimson Tide, Alabama has played all home games on-campus at Bryant–Denny Stadium. Prior to the 2006 season, the north endzone expansion brought the total seating capacity of Bryant–Denny to 92,138, the seventh largest stadium in college football. After Saban became head coach, in February 2009, the University of Alabama System Board of Trustees unanimously approved a proposal to expand the south endzone with an upper deck that seated approximately 9,000 spectators and added 36 luxury boxes. The expansion was budgeted at $80.6 million and Davis Architects of Birmingham, Alabama served as the architect of record for the project. The expansion was completed just prior to the start of the 2010 season on August 20 and increased Bryant–Denny's capacity to 101,821, the fifth largest in college football.

Outside the stadium on its northern side is the Walk of Champions. This areas pays tribute to past championship teams at Alabama in addition to featuring bronze statues of all five head coaches who won national championships with the Crimson Tide. After he led them to the 2009 national championship, athletics director Mal Moore indicated that a statue of Saban would be erected in the Walk of Champions just as the previous four coaches. The nine-foot statue was designed by Alabama student Jeremy Davis and fabricated by MTM Recognition of Oklahoma City, Oklahoma. It was officially unveiled prior to the 2011 A-Day spring game on April 16, 2011, and has since been updated to include subsequent championships.

Notes

References

Alabama Crimson Tide football
Alabama Crimson Tide football seasons
History of college football by team